Kismat is a 1980 Indian Hindi-language action drama film directed by Bhisham Kohli and produced by Yash Kohli. It stars Mithun Chakraborty, Ranjeeta, Shakti Kapoor, Om Shivpuri in pivotal roles.

Plot
Ganga is a dancing girl. Her mother Yashoda is searching her all her life longed. Jeevan, a goon, separated Ganga from her mother. Moti falls in love with Ganga and give her a new life.

Cast
 Mithun Chakraborty as Moti 
 Ranjeeta as Ganga
 Shakti Kapoor as Jeevan
 Om Shivpuri as Khan
 Jalal Agha
 Urmila Bhatt
 Shivangi Kolhapure as Moti's Sister

Soundtrack
Lyricist: Amit Khanna

References

External links
 

1980 films
1980s Hindi-language films
Films scored by Bappi Lahiri
Indian action drama films